Shatel is an Iranian Internet Service Provider and a "large" Local Internet registry based in Tehran, Iran . Shatel is the first ADSL2+ service provider in the country, and the first gigabit wireless network operator based on registered microwave frequency.

History

Shatel Group launched in 2002 after acquiring the ISP and ICP licenses from the Ministry of Information and Communication Technology of Iran, starting with a 20 personnel team. Shatel activities were initially focused on providing clients with Internet access using dialup services and international calling cards. In one year and in line with the growing usage of the Internet in Iran, the formation of the "radio services regulation" in the country, Shatel Group acquired Telecommunication Company of Iran’s PAP license.

After acquiring the licenses, Shatel invested in high speed ADSL2+ Internet access and the related supplementary services such as VPN, VOD, VODSL, as well as a network infrastructure for e-learning. With the expansion of the Group’s activities, various services and products were added to the Shatel basket, such as broadband in the forms of leased lines and wireless, as well as special LAN and MAN connection setup solutions for organizations.

In Sep 2011 Shatel awarded as one of the VoIP termination routes to Iran by Telecommunication Infrastructure Company of Iran.

Products and services
ADSL2+
VPN
VoDSL (Voice over DSL)
Video on Demand (VoD)
Content Hosting and setting up the network infrastructure for e-learning
Broadband services:
Wireless internet
G.SHDSL
point to point connection setups
Dialup Internet
VoIP
Wireless network solutions for backhauling and Last mile, utilizing microwave equipment
Kaspersky Anti-Virus Premier Business Reseller
 Training services in "Shatel Education and Research Center".

Shatel was one of the first companies in Iran to be awarded a Private Access Provider license (allowing them to deploy ADSL). Shatel ADSL2+ services are enabled in about 450 Telephone Centers national wide with about 80 Telephone Centers in Tehran. Founders of the Company Have begun their activity in the field of WAN, LAN computer networks designing and also disassembling satellite and wireless systems as spread in three main cities of Iran (Tehran, Karaj and Tabriz) since 1999.

Besides services mentioned above, Shatel Group of companies is the exclusive premium partner of ZyXEL manufacturer in Iran.

Achievements
Top data communication operator in first Information and Communication Technology National Festival (FAVA)
Top data communication operator in second consequent year and receiving golden statue and certificate from Ministry of communication and information technology
First rank among information technology service providers in third consequent year in Information and Communication Technology National Festival (FAVA)
"Matma" (Iranian Centre for National Internet Development) reported Shatel as one of 4 best service providers in Iran in 2010.
 "Three-Star Award" for establishment of EFQM (European Foundation for Quality Management) from the Industry, Mine and Trade Minister
 Diamond statue and 1st rank among all of IT corporations in Iran
 Among 4 fastest service providers up to Nov 2011 according to Mamta statistics.
 Receiving ISO 9001 certificate from IMQ in Feb 2012.
 Receiving National Quality Award (ICTINQA).
Receiving three star testimonial from Iranian Minister of industry, mine and trade
Receiving ISO 14001:2004 certificate

Offices and coverage

Head office is in northern Tehran, with many representatives and local branches around the country.

Organization
Headquarters office in Tehran has 800 employees with 160 in customer support department. Nationwide employees include about 1200 with about 400 engineers. Headquarter office has departments like market R&D, technical R&D, quality management, product marketing and training. This company has also relationships with Iranian universities for their employee training courses.

Competition
Shatel is in major competition with Afranet, ParsOnline, Sepanta, Neda Rayaneh and other local ISPs

References

External links
 Official Web Site

Companies established in 1999
Internet service providers of Iran
Privately held companies of Iran
Iranian brands
1999 establishments in Iran